Stephen Cox may refer to:

Stephen Cox (cyclist) (born 1956), retired racing cyclist from New Zealand
Stephen Cox (sculptor) (born 1946), British sculptor of stone
Stephen Cox (writer) (born 1966), American freelance writer and author
Stephen D. Cox (born 1948), American editor of Liberty magazine
Stephen J. Cox, former US Attorney in Texas

See also
Steve Cox (disambiguation)
Cox (surname)